The Order of Francysk Skaryna is an award of Belarus. It is named after Francysk Skaryna, one of the first book printers in Cyrillic script. Order of Francysk Skaryna is a single level award that was instituted on 13 April 1995; it is awarded for significant contributions in the fields of art, literature, historical study, etc.

Notable recipients 

 Patriarch Alexy II of Moscow
 Zhores Alferov
 Nadezhda Babkina
 Yuri Bashmet
 Nikolay Baskov
 Pavel Borodin
 Vasil Bykaŭ
 Pierre Cardin
 Andrzej Ciechanowiecki
 Viktor Drobysh
 Mohamed ElBaradei
 Valentin Elizariev
 Vladimir Gostyukhin
 Yury Grigorovich
 Mykola Hnatyuk
 Philipp Kirkorov
 Igor Luchenok
 Yury Luzhkov
 Igor Makarov (businessman)
 Vladimir Mulyavin
 Tamara Nizhnikova
 Aleksandra Pakhmutova
 Vladimir Vasilievich Rusakevich
 Viktor Sadovnichiy
 Mikhail Savitsky
 Gennadiy Seleznyov
 Alexander Tikhanovich
 Pavel Yakubovich
 Rostislav Yankovsky
 Boris Yeltsin
 Maria Zakharevich

See also
Orders, decorations, and medals of Belarus

References

Skaryna, Order of Francysk
Awards established in 1995
1995 establishments in Belarus
Recipients of the Order of Francysk Skaryna